Ome may refer to:

Places
 Ome (Bora Bora), a public island in the lagoon of Bora Bora
 Ome, Lombardy, Italy, a town and comune in the Province of Brescia
 Ōme, Tokyo, a city in the Prefecture of Tokyo
 Ome (crater), a crater on Mars

Transportation
 Ōme Line, a railway in the Prefecture of Tokyo
 Ōme Station, a railway station in Ōme
 Ōme (train), an express train on the Ōme Line
 OME, the IATA and FAA code for Nome Airport, Alaska

Acronym
 Office of Manpower Economics, a body of the United Kingdom government
 Ontario Ministry of Education, Canada
 Osaka Mercantile Exchange
 Otitis media with effusion, the accumulation of fluid in the middle ear

People
 Open Mike Eagle, a rapper from Los Angeles, California
 Jaslyn Ome, Playboy Playmate of the Month for April 2013

Chemicals
Polyoxymethylene dimethyl ethers Often abbreviated as OME3, OME4, OME5, and "OMEx" in papers where it is discussed as a Second-generation biofuel / Electrofuel

See also
 Ōme Kaidō, a main road running through the city of Ōme
 OME-B, OME-C, OME-E and OME-Ant, parts of the MINERVA spacecraft